The Quileute are a Native American people of western Washington state. Quileute may also refer to:

Quileute Canyon
Quileute language, their language
Quileute Tribal School, a Native American school in La Push, Washington
Quillayute River, a river on the Olympic Peninsula in western Washington state
USS Quileute (YTB-540), later YTM-540, a United States Navy tug placed in service in 1945 and sold in 1974